The 2022 Pacific Rugby League Tests are a group of rugby league test matches that were played on 25 June 2022 at Campbelltown Stadium in Sydney and Mount Smart Stadium, Auckland.

Fixtures

Tonga women in New Zealand

Tonga men in New Zealand

Samoa vs Cook Islands men in Australia

Fiji vs Papua New Guinea men in Australia

See also
 International rugby league in 2022

References 

2022 in rugby league
 
International rugby league competitions hosted by Australia
Oceanian rugby league competitions
Pacific Rugby League Tests
Pacific Rugby League Tests